Kastorfer See is a lake in the Mecklenburgische Seenplatte district in Mecklenburg-Vorpommern, Germany. At an elevation of 45.3 m, its surface area is 0.64 km².

Lakes of Mecklenburg-Western Pomerania